Dadi (Hindi दादी, meaning paternal grandmother) is a given name, which is common in India. It may refer to the following notable people:
Dheeya Dadi (born 2009) - Dadi of podar international school.
Dadi Denis (born 1976), Haitian sprinter
Dadi El Hocine Mouaki (born 1996), Algerian football player 
Dadi Gaye (born 1995), Gambian-Norwegian football player
Dadi Janki (1916–2020), Indian spiritual leader
 Dadi Jawari, a 17th-century female ruler of Gilgi
Dadi Leela (1916–2017), Pakistani educationist and music teacher
Dadi Mayuma (born 1981), football player from the Democratic Republic of the Congo
 Dadi Nicolas (born 1992), a Haitian professional American football player
 Dadi Pudumjee, Indian puppeteer
Dadi Toka Jr, Papua New Guinea politician
Dadi Yami (born 1982), Ethiopian long-distance runner 
Zhou Dadi (born 1996), Chinese football player